Mark Jonathan Easton (born 1963) is a former male track and field athlete who competed for England in the walking events.

Athletics career
Easton was twice English champion after winning the 1989 and 1990 AAA Championships in the 10,000 metres walk.

Easton represented at four consecutive Commonwealth Games; he represented England in the 30Km walk event, at the 1990 Commonwealth Games in Auckland, New Zealand. Four years later he competed once again in the 30 Km walk, representing England at the 1994 Commonwealth Games in Victoria, British Columbia, Canada. At his third Games he stepped up in distance to 50 Km and represented England, at the 1998 Commonwealth Games in Kuala Lumpur, Malaysia. His fourth and final appearance was at the 2002 Commonwealth Games in Manchester.

References

1963 births
Living people
Commonwealth Games competitors for England
British male racewalkers
English male racewalkers
Athletes (track and field) at the 1990 Commonwealth Games
Athletes (track and field) at the 1994 Commonwealth Games
Athletes (track and field) at the 1998 Commonwealth Games
Athletes (track and field) at the 2002 Commonwealth Games